The 1995 Michigan State Spartans football team competed on behalf of Michigan State University as member of the Big Ten Conference during the 1995 NCAA Division I-A football season. Led by first-year head coach Nick Saban, the Spartans compiled an overall record of 6–5–1 with a mark of 4–3–1 in conference play, placing fifth in Big Ten. Michigan State was invited to the Independence Bowl, where they lost on December 29 to LSU. The team played home games at Spartan Stadium in East Lansing, Michigan.

Schedule

Roster

Game summaries

Nebraska

Louisville

Purdue

Boston College

Iowa

Illinois

Minnesota

Wisconsin

Michigan

Indiana

Penn State

1995 Independence Bowl

1996 NFL Draft
The following players were selected in the 1996 NFL Draft.

References

Michigan State
Michigan State Spartans football seasons
Michigan State Spartans football